Braydon Trindall (born 11 July 1999) is an Australian professional rugby league footballer who plays as a  for the Cronulla-Sutherland Sharks in the NRL.

Background
Born in Wee Waa, New South Wales, Trindall, who is of Indigenous Australian descent, moved to Queensland at age 11. He played his junior rugby league for the Caboolture Snakes, before being signed by the Melbourne Storm.

Playing career

2015 - 2017
In 2015, Trindall played for the Sunshine Coast Falcons in the Cyril Connell Cup and represented the Queensland under-16 team and the Queensland under-16 Murri team. In 2016, he moved up to the Falcons' Mal Meninga Cup side. In 2017, he played for the Melbourne Storm under-20 side, playing 14 games.

2018
In 2018, Trindall joined the Cronulla-Sutherland Sharks, playing for their Jersey Flegg Cup side. On 23 September 2018, he was named man of the match in their Grand Final win over the Penrith Panthers.

2019
In 2019, he spent the season playing for the Newtown Jets, Cronulla's NSW Cup feeder club and represented the Queeensland under-20 team. That season, he played in Newtown's NSW Cup Grand Final and NRL State Championship-winning sides.

2020
In round 12 of the 2020 NRL season, Trindall made his debut for Cronulla-Sutherland against the Brisbane Broncos at Suncorp Stadium.

2021
Trindall played 18 games for Cronulla in the 2021 NRL season which saw the club narrowly miss the finals by finishing 9th on the table.

2022
Trindall played a total of 15 games for Cronulla in the 2022 NRL season scoring one try.  Trindall did not play in Cronulla's finals campaign which saw them eliminated in the second week.

Statistics

NRL
 Statistics are correct as of the end of the 2022 season

All Star

References

External links
Cronulla Sharks profile
NRL profile

1999 births
Living people
Australian rugby league players
Indigenous Australian rugby league players
Cronulla-Sutherland Sharks players
Newtown Jets NSW Cup players
Rugby league halfbacks
Rugby league players from Wee Waa